Tamar Svetlin (born 30 July 2001) is a Slovenian professional footballer who plays as a midfielder for Slovenian PrvaLiga side Bravo, on loan from Celje.

References

External links
 Soccerway profile
 NZS profile 

2001 births
Living people
Footballers from Ljubljana
Slovenian footballers
Slovenia youth international footballers
Slovenia under-21 international footballers
Association football midfielders
NK Domžale players
NK Celje players
NK Bravo players
Slovenian PrvaLiga players